Fulgurofusus nanshaensis is a species of large sea snail, marine gastropod mollusk in the family Turbinellidae.

Description

Distribution
Fulgurofusus nanshaensis was first located in the South China Sea.

References

Turbinellidae
Gastropods described in 2003